Wedding Bells is a lost 1921 American silent romantic-comedy film directed by Chester Withey and starring Constance Talmadge and Harrison Ford.

Plot
As described in a film magazine, Rosalie Wayne (Talmadge) meets Reginald Carter (Ford) after he introduces himself while chasing her dog with one of his oxfords, and she marries him in haste. Reggie comes down with the measles following a quarrel over her bobbed hair, not knowing he is ill she leaves for Reno and then Europe. After a year's absence and having secured her divorce, she meets Reggie again and finds him engaged to another. Jealousy arouses her to break up the match, but the wedding is progressing before she devises a means of doing so. Reggie, however, is satisfied and glad to be reunited with his Rosalie despite her sharp tongue and unusual method of winning his love.

Cast
 Constance Talmadge as Rosalie Wayne
 Harrison Ford as Reginald Carter
 Emily Chichester as Marcia Hunter
 Ida Darling as Mme. Hunter
 James Harrison as Douglas Ordway
 William Roselle as Spencer Wells
 Polly Bailey as Hooper (credited as Polly Van)
 Dallas Welford as Jackson
 Frank Honda as Fuzisaki

References

External links 

1921 films
Films directed by Chester Withey
American silent feature films
First National Pictures films
Lost American films
American black-and-white films
1920s romantic comedy-drama films
American romantic comedy-drama films
1921 lost films
Lost comedy-drama films
1921 comedy films
1921 drama films
1920s American films
Silent romantic comedy-drama films
Silent American comedy-drama films
1920s English-language films